Pelitli is a village in the Üzümlü District, Erzincan Province, Turkey. The village is populated by Kurds and had a population of 50 in 2021.

The hamlets of Baykan, Canbey, Değirmendere, Geçit, Gelincik, Kayacık, Konaklar, Kuzulu, Mezraa, Taşlık and Yıldız are attached to the village.

References 

Villages in Üzümlü District
Kurdish settlements in Erzincan Province